Sobha Naidu (1956 – 14 October 2020) was among the foremost Kuchipudi dancers of India and a disciple of the renowned master Vempati Chinna Satyam. She mastered the technique of Kuchipudi and began dancing lead roles in dance-dramas at a young age. She performed with her guru's troupe extensively, performing the roles of Satyabhama and Padmavati. Principal of Kuchipudi Art Academy, Hyderabad, Sobha Naidu imparted training to younger students over the past few years.
In 2010, the school celebrated the completion of 30 years. She also choreographed several dance-dramas. She received the title of Nritya Choodamani from Krishna Gana Sabha, Madras.

Early life
Sobha Naidu was born in Anakapalle, Anakapalli district, Andhra Pradesh state in 1956. She earned a degree from Queen Mary's college.

Regardless of family opposition, her mother Sarojini Devi had her tutored by P.L. Reddy at Rajamahendravaram. After which she trained under the legendary Sri Vempati Chinna Satyam. She was an outstanding student of Vempati.

Awards and achievements

With twelve years of rigorous practice, some of her best roles are her portraits of Sathyabhama, Padmavathi and Chandalika. She choreographed eighty solo numbers, fifteen ballets, and trained over 1500 students from India and overseas.

Naidu was admired not just in the country, but all over the world. Organized by the TANA, she traveled across the USA to perform. She also represented India in various cultural events in like U.K., U.S.S.R., Syria, Turkey, Hong Kong, Baghdad, Kampuchea, and Bangkok. On behalf of the Indian government, Shobha Naidu led a cultural delegation to West Indies, Mexico, Venezuela, Tunis, and Cuba, followed by a visit to West Asia.

Padma Shri award in 2001
Nritya Choodamani award in 1982
She received the Sangeet Natak Akademi Award for her contribution to Kuchipudi dance in 1991
Nritya Kala Siromani award in 1996
NTR National Award in 1998
AP State Government Hamsa Award

References

 Kuchipudi Sammelan 
 SPIC MACAY 
 http://www.hyderabadbest.com/discoverhyd/personalities/dance/Shobhanaidu.asp

External links
Information about Kuchipudi
Comprehensive Background On Kuchipudi
Kuchipudi Dancer in Sydney

Indian female classical dancers
Performers of Indian classical dance
2020 deaths
Kuchipudi exponents
1956 births
Recipients of the Padma Shri in arts
Recipients of the Kala Ratna
Indian women choreographers
Indian choreographers
People from Visakhapatnam district
Dancers from Andhra Pradesh
20th-century Indian dancers
20th-century Indian women artists
Women artists from Andhra Pradesh
Recipients of the Sangeet Natak Akademi Award